Behlola is a town and union council of Charsadda District in Khyber Pakhtunkhwa province of Pakistan. It is located at 34°15'8N 71°50'33E and has an altitude of 327 metres (1076 feet).

References

Union councils of Charsadda District
Populated places in Charsadda District, Pakistan